"Thrash Unreal" is a single by punk group Against Me!. It is the second single from their album New Wave. It was their first single to chart in the United States, hitting #11 on Billboard's Alternative Songs chart, becoming their highest-charting song. The title of the song was coined by the album's producer, Butch Vig. It was also released as a downloadable track for the Rock Band video game series on March 17, 2009.

Vinyl single
The single was made for sale on 7" single on July 10, 2007 as a limited edition bonus for preordering New Wave. It was distributed through Interpunk, Smartpunk and No Idea Records. It was pressed on black and red vinyl with 6,500 and 500 copies printed for each color, respectively.

Track listing
 "Thrash Unreal" - 4:14
 "You Must Be Willing" - 4:25

CD single
The CD version of the "Thrash Unreal" single was released in October, 2007, on Sire Records and contains a different track 2 from the vinyl release.

Track listing
 "Thrash Unreal" - 4:14
 "New Wave" (acoustic) - 3:23

Lyrical connection
The lyric, "She can still hear that rebel yell just as loud as it was in 1983", refers to the Billy Idol song, "Rebel Yell", which was released in 1983.

Music video

The video portrays a girl who seems distressed during a party while the band is found playing in the basement under the room the party is taking place in.  When she drops her glass of wine after a man starts touching her, the wine seeps through a small drain in the floor upstairs and spills onto the band downstairs.  The girl then isolates herself from the party and releases her anger by stomping on the floor, breaking some plaster that falls on the band as well.  Around the same time, a few of the partygoers (New Wave producer Butch Vig being one of them) dump a huge vat of wine over the floor, showering the band in both plaster and wine. The atmosphere of the party also intensifies shortly afterward. Eventually, the girl hits the floor hard enough to break through it and she falls into the basement. She lands on her feet where the band is playing, seemingly elated to be away from the chaos upstairs. The video ends with a final scene that simply shows the empty, wine-drenched basement with only the band's equipment displayed.

Charts

References

2007 singles
2007 songs
Against Me! songs
Sire Records singles
Song recordings produced by Butch Vig
Songs written by Laura Jane Grace
Songs against capitalism
Songs about drugs